Thriller is a British television series, originally broadcast in the UK from 1973 to 1976. It is an anthology series: each episode has a self-contained story and its own cast. As the title suggests, each story is a thriller of some variety, from tales of the supernatural to down-to-earth whodunits.

Background
The series was created by Brian Clemens, who also scripted the majority of the episodes and story-lined every installment. It was produced by John Sichel (the first three series), John Cooper (series 4) and Ian Fordyce (the final two series) for Associated Television (ATV) at its Elstree studios north of London. The series evolved from Clemens' previous work, in particular two films in a similar style: And Soon the Darkness (1970) and Blind Terror (aka See No Evil, 1971); the latter shares plot similarities with the Thriller episodes "The Eyes Have It" and "The Next Voice You See". Original music, including the theme tune, was supplied by Clemens' regular collaborator Laurie Johnson.

The original UK title sequence featured still shots of locations in the story, devoid of people, shot through a fisheye lens, bordered in bright red and set to Johnson's eerie, discordant theme music. With an eye to the American re-broadcast market, most episodes, especially from the second season onwards, featured at least one American principal character, portrayed by an American actor. After originally being screened late at night in the U.S. under the ABC Wide World of Entertainment billing from 1973, some episodes were retitled for U.S. syndication in 1978, and all had additional opening sequences shot with new titles and credits but without the original cast and, for this reason, often only featuring menacing figures seen from the neck down. These title sequences were used in Britain when the series was repeated on regional ITV stations in the 1980s, and are also included as extras on the Complete Series box set.  When the series was re-broadcast as part of The CBS Late Movie however, the original title sequences and music were restored.

The stories were often set in the London commuter belt. A particular trademark of the series' storytelling was to hook the viewer with a simple yet totally baffling situation, of the kind seen in films such as Les Diaboliques (1955). "Come Out Come Out, Wherever You Are" takes place at a creaky country house hotel: a female guest begins asking about her missing travelling companion whom the owner claims was not with her upon arrival the previous evening and whom none of the other guests initially recall seeing. One episode, "Screamer", concerns a rape victim who murders her attacker, only to then see the man stalking her everywhere. Perhaps the most ingenious episode is the Dial M for Murder-style "The Double Kill", in which a man hires a hitman to kill his wife, but makes a fatal error in his otherwise meticulous planning.

Other memorable episodes include: "Someone at the Top of the Stairs", one of a handful of forays into the supernatural, in which two female students move into a boarding house and begin to notice that none of the other residents ever go out or receive any mail; and "I'm The Girl He Wants to Kill", in which a witness to a murder finds herself trapped in a deserted office block overnight with the killer, and is forced to play a deadly game of cat-and-mouse with him to survive (there is barely any dialogue throughout its second half). Brian Clemens' own favourite episode, "A Coffin for the Bride" (US: Kiss Kiss, Kill Kill), featured a performance from a young Helen Mirren.

Following a worldwide audit during 2003–04 by the then copyright-holders Carlton, almost all the original UK PAL fisheye-titled 2" videotapes of Thriller were located and transferred onto modern digital tape by the British Film Institute, with subsequent restoration work by BBC Resources. One exception was the story "Nurse Will Make It Better"; however, this too exists in PAL/original format on the later 1" videotape format as a dub from the original master tape (this version was broadcast on the satellite channel Bravo in 1996).

In 2008 a DVD box set containing all six series was released.

Episodes
For episodes that used a different title in the U.S., the U.S. title is shown in italics underneath the original British title.

Series 1 (1973)

Series 2 (1974)

Series 3 (1974)

Series 4 (1975)

Series 5 (1975)

Series 6 (1976)

Trivia

Dinsdale Landen is the only actor who plays the same named role – that of private investigator Matthew Earp – in two episodes, "An Echo of Theresa" and "The Next Scream You Hear", although Reg Lye plays an unnamed 'Caretaker' in both "Spell of Evil" and "Good Salary - Prospects - Free Coffin" who could conceivably be the same character.

References

External links
THRILLER website
A THRILLER in Every Corner
Thriller interview at Headpress
Humour in Thriller

 

ShoutFactoryTV

British supernatural television shows
British fantasy television series
ITV television dramas
Television series by ITV Studios
1973 British television series debuts
1976 British television series endings
1970s British anthology television series
1970s British drama television series
Television shows produced by Associated Television (ATV)
English-language television shows
Television shows shot at ATV Elstree Studios